Tallinn University of Applied Sciences (TTK) is a vocational university in Tallinn, Estonia, founded in 1992. It provides higher education in the field of engineering.

Tallinn College of Engineering is a legal successor to the Tallinn Technical Secondary School for Building and Mechanics established in 1962, that itself was built upon the Tallinn Commercial School for Boys, founded in 1915.

University has 6 institutes: Institute of Architecture, Institute of Circular Economy and Technology, Institute of Clothing and Textile, Institute of Civil Engineering, Institute of Logistics, and Institute of Technology.

References

External links
 
 

Universities and colleges in Estonia
Education in Tallinn
1992 establishments in Estonia
Educational institutions established in 1992